Kevin Fisher-Daniel (born 27 March 1995) is a British Virgin Islands international footballer who plays for Panthers FC, as a striker.

Club career
Fisher played club football for Islanders FC, before playing college soccer with Otero Junior College.

After leaving Otero he returned to Islanders FC. After a spell in England with Tooting Bec, in November 2021 he returned to the British Virgin Islands to play with Panthers FC.

International career
He made his international debut for the British Virgin Islands in 2014.

International career statistics

References

1995 births
Living people
British Virgin Islands footballers
British Virgin Islands international footballers
Islanders FC players
Tooting Bec F.C. players
Panthers FC players
Association football forwards
British Virgin Islands expatriate footballers
British Virgin Islands expatriate sportspeople in the United States
Expatriate soccer players in the United States
British Virgin Islands expatriate sportspeople in England
Expatriate footballers in England